The Viola Sertaneja is a stringed musical instrument from northeastern Brazil. It has 10 strings in 5 courses. The strings are made of steel. It is tuned E2, A3, D4, G4, B3, E4 E4 E4.

References
 The Stringed Instrument Database 
 ATLAS of Plucked Instruments

String instruments